The Philadelphia Warriors were an American basketball team based in Philadelphia, Pennsylvania that was a member of the American Basketball League.

During their first season, the team was renamed the Philadelphia Warriors (also known as the Quakers).

The Warriors were borne out of the Philadelphia SPHAs, (South Philadelphia Hebrew Association) and headed up by Eddie Gottlieb, a Philadelphia native who tried, through various leagues and teams, to bring about both national and Philadelphia-based basketball associations to the country. He was player-coach for a long time, eventually winning a title with the Warriors in the early days of the NBA. The ABL lasted only a few years before becoming defunct, leaving the Warriors without an organization for a short time, only to end up in the National Basketball Association with player like Paul Arizin and Wilt Chamberlain, eventually winning the city of Philadelphia's first ever basketball title.

The Warriors were a team primarily employing white players during the days of the ABL, although not exclusively. They benefited from the folding of the New York Rens, by far the most skilled team of the time, who were pushed out of professional basketball by the refusal of the league, and particularly the all-white New York Celtics to play games against exclusively black teams. Philadelphia, as a city that is particularly heavily lived-in by black citizens, looked at basketball as both an opportunity for recognition and escape. Young men had "hoop dreams" and wanted to fight their way to the ABL, or NBA today, and having a local successful professional basketball team allowed for the observation of successful black men in a sport that they were interested in. This resulted also in a feeling of community in the city between black men, and contributed to the culture of racial minorities in Philadelphia that the city is known for. The Warriors factored heavily into the progress of young black athletes in the city, which has continued to this day with things like the Chosen League that occurs annually.

Notable players
 Al Kellett 
 George Artus 
 Tom Barlow 
 Harry Riconda 
 Lou Schneiderman 
 Red Sherr 
 Stretch Meehan 
 Chick Passon
 Teddy Kearns
 George Glasco

References